Joint-Stock Company Moscow Distillery Crystal, formerly known as Moscow State Wine Warehouse No. 1, is a distillery in Moscow, Russia, known for producing traditional Russian vodka. Founded in 1901 as a state-sanctioned distillery, Kristall is the largest liquor and vodka enterprise in Russia, and is best known internationally as the birthplace of the Stolichnaya vodka brand.

History
In 1896, by decree of the Minister of Finance of the Russian Empire, Sergei Yulevich Vitte, a state monopoly on the production and sale of alcoholic beverages was introduced.

On June 24, 1901, Moscow State Wine Warehouse No. 1 was founded as a state-sanctioned vodka and wine distillery in Moscow, located on the banks of the Yauza River in the east of the city. The distillery employed 1,500 people and was planned to produce 600,000 state vodka buckets per year, however, only a week after opening plans were made to expand production due to unexpectedly high demand, and instead produced 2,100,000 (approximately 2.6 million decalitres) in its first year of operation. At the beginning, production was divided among three quality divisions, from lowest to highest quality: "simple", "improved", and "boyarskaya". 

From October 31, 1914, due to Russia's participation in the First World War, the distillery's production was cut down and was closed to the civilian market because of a dry law, while production continued for the military, foreign market, and medical applications. A military hospital was situated for some time in the unused areas of the distillery building. Due to the collapse of the Russian Empire and the rise of the Bolsheviks to power, it was not until 1923 that pre-war production was restored at the distillery as a state-owned enterprise of the Soviet Union. By January 1, 1924, the distillery had produced 844,720 litres of vodka. 

During the Second World War, in addition to vodka production, the distillery also produced "Molotov cocktail" weapons for the Soviet war effort. The distillery was severely damaged by a German bomb on July 22, 1941, igniting flammable products in the building, but despite the heavy damage production continued. For contributions during the war, the distillery was awarded the Banner of the State Defense Committee.

In January 1987, the distillery received its current name, Moscow Distillery Crystal. In 1993, following the dissolution of the Soviet Union, the distillery became a private joint-stock company and the Moscow Distillery Kristall name trade mark were registered.

References

External links

Moscow Distillery Cristall (English; official website)

Drink companies of the Soviet Union
Distilleries in Russia
Manufacturing companies based in Moscow
Food and drink companies based in Moscow
Cultural heritage monuments in Moscow